The ITF Women's Circuit is the second-tier tour for women's professional tennis organised by the International Tennis Federation, and is a tier below the WTA Tour. The ITF Women's Circuit includes tournaments with prize money ranging from $10,000 up to $100,000.

Schedule

January

February

March

April

May

June

July

Retired players

References

External links
International Tennis Federation (ITF) official website

 
ITF Women's Circuit
ITF Women's World Tennis Tour
2009 in women's tennis